Elmer Ellsworth Foster (August 15, 1861 – July 22, 1946) was an American outfielder in Major League Baseball who played from 1886 to 1891. He played for the New York Metropolitans, New York Giants, and Chicago Colts.

External links

1861 births
1946 deaths
19th-century baseball players
Major League Baseball outfielders
New York Metropolitans players
New York Giants (NL) players
Chicago Colts players
St. Paul Apostles players
Haverhill (minor league baseball) players
Minneapolis Millers (baseball) players
Kansas City Blues (baseball) players
Baseball players from Minneapolis